State Road 341 in the U.S. state of Indiana is a north–south state highway in Fountain County in the west-central part of the state.

Route description
The road starts near the south edge of the county at State Road 234 just over a mile south of Wallace.  It passes north through the town of Hillsboro, where it is concurrent with Main Street and U.S. Route 136, then crosses Interstate 74 just north of Hillsboro and continues through the towns of Mellott and Newtown, and terminates at State Road 28 east of Attica.

Major intersections

References

External links

341
Transportation in Fountain County, Indiana